The Atrek, also known as the Attruck, Atrak, and Etrek, is a fast-moving river which begins in the mountains of north-eastern Iran, and flows  westward draining into the south-eastern corner of the Caspian Sea in Turkmenistan. Because of the high use of its waters for irrigation, it only flows into the Caspian when it is in flood stage.

Geography

Politics
A 1957 treaty between Iran and the USSR assigns equal rights to 50% of the water of the frontier parts of the Atrek. The same treaty also applies to the Aras River, which now forms part of the border between Iran and Azerbaijan.

Ecology
Even though sturgeons concentrate in the area of the Caspian Sea next to the Turkmen coast, they do not currently migrate into the Atrek River owing to its low water level and pollution. Since the Atrek is the only Caspian watershed river of the Turkmen coast, sturgeons no longer reproduce in Turkmenistan.

See also 
Chandyr River

References

Rivers of North Khorasan Province
Rivers of Turkmenistan
International rivers of Asia
Iran–Turkmenistan border
Landforms of Golestan Province
Border rivers
Landforms of North Khorasan Province
Tributaries of the Caspian Sea